The 2001 Vuelta a Murcia was the 17th professional edition of the Vuelta a Murcia cycle race and was held on 7 March to 11 March 2001. The race started and finished in Murcia. The race was won by Aitor González.

General classification

References

2001
2001 in road cycling
2001 in Spanish sport